"I See You Baby" is a song by British duo Groove Armada, featuring Gram'ma Funk on vocals. The song was also recorded with the chorus line "shakin' that thang" (to replace "shakin' that ass") for various markets around the world, and also for use in American TV commercials. The song was later remixed by Fatboy Slim, with this latter version appearing in airplay. It was also remixed by Futureshock.

The Fatboy Slim remix featured extensively in a Renault Megane television advertising campaign in the United Kingdom in 2003. The Futureshock dance version is used as the theme for the show MTV Cribs since 2000.

Although the single only peaked at number seventeen in the UK Singles Chart upon its original release in November 1999, it became very popular due to its inclusion on its parent album Vertigo, and various dance compilations. A reissue of the song on the compilation album The Best of Groove Armada saw it reach a new peak of number eleven on the chart almost five years later on 20 September 2004.

Critical reception
David Stubbs from NME commented, "A fairly Spanish Armada this one, as, though the tide may have gone out on this year's festival of concrete and kit-off, there is a part of the English psyche that is forever Ibiza. A moderately salacious theme is set up by the worrying "I see you baby/Shaking that ass" refrain but the obligatory refusal of the tune to develop would seemingly confine the designated shaking to the gym and the stationary sweat of the travelator rather than anything more 'saucy'. Yes of course there's a Fatboy Slim remix. Are you mad?"

Music videos

First version
The first version of the music video, in the vein of 20 Minute Workout, features women in an aerobics class in a white room, exercising to the song.

Fatboy Slim Remix
The second version of the music video utilizes the Fatboy Slim remix and features a security guard, played by David Pires, watching women and some men stripping in a restroom.

Charts

Weekly charts

Year-end charts

Certifications

References

1999 songs
1999 singles
2004 singles
Bertelsmann Music Group singles
Groove Armada songs
Jive Records singles
Songs written by Andy Cato